Secret Love is a 1994 Philippine drama film edited and directed by Edgardo "Boy" Vinarao. The film stars Geneva Cruz and Jomari Yllana.

Cast
 Geneva Cruz as Carmina
 Jomari Yllana as Jodi
 Eddie Gutierrez as Ronald
 Elizabeth Oropesa as Sonia
 Juan Rodrigo as Romy
 Carol Dauden as Mila
 Dennis Roldan as Efren
 Beth Tamayo as Gina
 Luigi Alvarez as Albert
 Bernard Atienza as Albert's Father

References

External links

1994 films
Filipino-language films
Philippine drama films
FLT Films films